Shrigley may refer to:
Places
 Shrigley, County Down, Northern Ireland
 Pott Shrigley, a small village and civil parish in Cheshire, England
location of Shrigley Hall
People
 David Shrigley, a British artist
 Patricia Shrigley, a British video artist
Other
 Shrigley abduction, an attempted forced marriage between an heiress and Edward Gibbon Wakefield
 Shrigley and Hunt, a manufacturer of stained glass windows